The Wendenstöcke are a multi-summited mountain of the Uri Alps, overlooking Gadmen in the canton of Bern. The main summit (3,042 m) is named Gross Wendenstock.

References

External links
 Wendenstöcke on Hikr

Mountains of the Alps
Alpine three-thousanders
Mountains of Switzerland
Mountains of the canton of Bern